The Palmerston Forts along the Bristol Channel include:

Brean Down Fort, Weston-super-Mare
Flat Holm Battery, Flat Holm
Lavernock Battery, Penarth
 Nell's Point Battery , Barry Island  (Coastwatch site)
 Steep Holm Battery, Steep Holm (Victorian Forts Data Sheet)

Bristol